Werich is a surname. Notable people with the surname include:

Jan Werich (1905–1980), Czech actor, playwright, and writer
 (1935–1981), Czech actress and translator

See also
2418 Voskovec-Werich, a main belt asteroid

German-language surnames